Port Townsend Aero Museum is an aviation museum located at Jefferson County International Airport in Port Townsend, Washington.

History
The museum was founded in 2001 by Jerry and Peggy Thoutte with six flyable aircraft. The museum was initially located in a number of hangars at the airport, but moved into a new building in 2008. The Thouttes retired from daily operations in 2016 and Michael Payne took over as director.

On April 28, 2019, a PT-17 Stearman biplane that belonged to the museum made an emergency landing on a beach in Discovery Bay, Washington after an in flight engine failure. The forced landing onto the narrow sloping beach resulted in significant damage to the airframe, but caused only minor injuries for the pilot and passenger.

A 5,400 sq. ft. expansion of the museum is under construction and is slated to be open to the public in spring of 2023.

Aircraft on display

 Aeronca C-3B Master
 Aeronca 7AC Champion
 Aeronca L-3
 Beechcraft C17B Staggerwing
 Boeing P-12C – Replica
 Bowlus BA-100 Baby Albatross
 CallAir A-2
 Cessna 140
 Corben Baby Ace
 Curtiss-Wright Junior
 de Havilland Canada DHC-1 Chipmunk
 Dormoy Bathtub
 Fairchild 22 C7B
 Fairchild 24W40
 Fairchild M62 – Painted as a PT-19B
 Howard DGA-4 – Replica
 Laister-Kauffman LK-10A
 Mooney M-18LA Mite
 Pietenpol Sky Scout
 Piper J3C-65 Cub
 Rose Parakeet
 Schleicher Ka 6E
 Stinson SM-8A Junior
 Taylorcraft B
 Taylorcraft BC-12-D
 Travel Air 2000

References

 https://web.archive.org/web/20190109224333/http://www.ptaeromuseum.com/collection_aircraft.html

External links
Official website

Aero museum
Museums in Jefferson County, Washington
Aerospace museums in Washington (state)